Demir Hisar is a municipality in the southwestern part of North Macedonia. Demir Hisar, which means "iron fortress" in Turkish, is also the name of the town where the municipal seat is found. Demir Hisar municipality is part of the Pelagonia Statistical Region.

Geography
The municipality borders Kičevo Municipality to the north, Kruševo Municipality and Mogila Municipality to the east, Bitola Municipality to the south, and Resen Municipality, Ohrid Municipality, and Debarca Municipality to the west.

Demographics

According to the last national census from 2021 this municipality has 7,260 inhabitants.

Ethnic groups in the municipality include:

References

External links
Official website

 
Pelagonia Statistical Region
Municipalities of North Macedonia